Zion is the third studio album by Australian contemporary worship music band Hillsong United. It was released on 22 February 2013 for Australia, and was released by 26 February 2013 internationally, under Hillsong Music and Sparrow Records. Production for the album began in March 2011 in Sydney, Australia. Michael Guy Chislett and band member Joel Houston oversaw production of the album, with the latter serving as executive producer.

Two singles were released to promote the album: "Scandal of Grace" on 5 February 2013, and "Oceans (Where Feet May Fail)" on 10 September 2013.

Background
Hillsong United gave an interview to CCM Magazines Grace Cartwright Aspinwall about the album.

Critical reception

Zion garnered praise from the ratings and reviews of music critics. At Christian Broadcasting Network, Hannah Goodwyn rated the album four-and-a-half spins, writing that "The music, the lyrics, the movement, it all comes together in Zion." Matt Conner of CCM Magazine rated the album four stars, stating that this is yet "Another strong United release." Andrea Hunter of Worship Leader rated the album four-and-a-half stars, writing that listeners will "find songs across generations and traditions to honor God and transform hearts." At Cross Rhythms, Tony Cummings rated the album a perfect ten squares, saying that the band "have released a peach of an album". In addition, Cross Rhythms' Stephen Curry rated the album a perfect ten squares, indicating how the release contains "a variety of sounds and moments of creativity", and the band "should be applauded for their subtle but brave changes in musical direction." Ryan Barbee of Jesus Freak Hideout rated the album four-and-a-half stars, stating that he takes his hat off due "to your art." According to Scott Fryberger of Jesus Freak Hideout, who rated the album four stars, says that this is "the best album United has ever released". Jonathan Andre of Indie Vision Music rated the album four stars, writing that the release "is full of lyrically rich themes and messages against the backdrop of electronic music that presents a unique way of creating worship music". At New Release Today, Mary Burklin rated the album four-and-a-half stars, stating that "a richly textured release that manages to achieve an intimate, organic feel despite the band's massive international reach." David Jeffries of AllMusic rated the album three-and-a-half stars, writing that the release is "just a touch overstuffed." At Louder Than the Music, Jono Davies rated the album a perfect five stars, remarking how the release is "Epic, Brilliant and Original." Emily Kjonaas of Christian Music Zine rated the album three-and-a-half stars, saying that "this is a great worship album that will help you keep your focus on Christ."

Commercial performance
Zion is Hillsong United's most successful album to date, with 34,100 units being sold in its first week. It sold 25% more than Aftermath, allowing it to debut at number five on the US Billboard 200. The album was also their seventh No.1 on the US Christian Albums chart. The album has sold 169,000 copies in the US as of May 2015.

The album debuted at No. 1 on the Australian Albums Chart and has since been certified gold by the Australian Recording Industry Association for sales exceeding 35,000 copies.

Track listing

Personnel
Adapted from AllMusic and Zion booklet.Hillsong UnitedMatt Crocker – vocals, acoustic guitar, percussion, keyboard, synthesizer
Adam Crosariol – bass
Jonathon Douglass – vocals, electric piano, percussion
Jad Gillies – vocals, electric guitar, percussion
Joel Houston – vocals, electric guitar, keyboard, synthesizer, bass
Peter James – piano, keyboard, synthesizer
Timon Klein – electric guitar
Simon Kobler – drums, percussion
Dylan Thomas – electric guitarAdditional musiciansMichael Guy Chislett – acoustic guitar, electric guitar, keyboard, percussion, strings arrangement, synthesizer
Jay Cook – backing vocals
Evie Gallardo – violin
Joel Hingston – electric guitar
Carli Marino – vocals
Steven Robertson – acoustic guitar on "Arise"
James Rudder – percussion
Taya Smith – vocals
Ryan Taubert – strings arrangement
Ben Tennikoff – piano, organ, piano accordion, keyboard, synthesizer
Matt Tennikoff – bass
Laura Toggs – backing vocals
David Ware – vocals on "Mountain"
Michaeli Whitney – celloProduction'
Jay Argaet – art direction
Jonathon Baker – engineer
Nathan Cahyadi – art design
Michael Guy Chislett – producer, mixing, engineer, programming
Adam Dodson – project manager
Sam Gibson – mixing
Bobbie Houston – senior pastor
Brian Houston – senior pastor
Joel Houston – executive producer, producer
Peter James – programming
Matt Johnson – photography
Simon Kobler – programming
Stephen Marcussen – mastering
Jim Monk – engineer
James Rudder – mixing, engineer
Ben Tennikoff – programming
Ben Whincop – engineer
Stewart Whitmore – digital editor

Charts

Weekly charts

Year-end charts

Decade-end charts

Certifications

References

External links 
Worship Leader magazine interview and performance

2013 albums
Hillsong United albums